Events in the year 1600 in Norway.

Incumbents
Monarch: Christian IV

Events
 Cort Aslakssøn becomes the first Norwegian professor at the University of Copenhagen.

Births

Deaths

Jens Nilssøn, Bishop of the Diocese of Oslo (born 1538).

See also

References